Sunn is a brand of musical instrument amplifiers.

Sunn may also refer to:

 Sunn O))), an American drone metal band
 Crotalaria juncea, known as sunn or sunn hemp, a tropical Asian plant of the legume family
 SUNN, a solar car
 Sunn pest, an insect pest of cereal crops

See also

 Sun (disambiguation)
 Son (disambiguation)
 Sonne (disambiguation)